The following is a timeline of the history of the city of Rostov-on-Don, Russia.

Prior to 20th century

 1761 - Fortress of Saint Dimitry of Rostov established.
 1796 - Settlement chartered, becomes seat of Rostovsky Uyezd within Novorossiysk Governorate.
 1811 -  design adopted.
 1834 - Port established; fort demolished.
 1842 - Synagogue built.
 1868 - Main Choral Synagogue built.
 1869 - Rostov-Glavny train station built.
 1870 - Kharkiv-Rostov railway begins operating.
 1881 - Population: 70,700.
 1896 - Moskovskaya Hotel built.
 1897 - Population: 119,889.
 1899 - Rostov City Hall built.

20th century

 1905 - Population: 126,375.
 1908 -  built.
 1912 - Zaslavskaya House built.
 1913 - Population: 204,725.
 1915 - Rostov State University founded.
 1917 - Cossacks take city.
 1920
 January: Red Army takes city.
  established.
 1926 - Population: 308,103.
 1927 - Rostov Zoo established.
 1928
 Nakhichevan-on-Don becomes part of city.
 Regional capital relocated to Rostov from Novocherkassk.
 1929
  created.
 Rostselmash agricultural equipment company established.
 1930
 Selmashstroy football club formed.
 Olimp-2 stadium built.
 1936 -  established.
 1937
 RODKA football club formed.
 1939
 Rostvertol helicopter manufactory established.
 Population: 520,253.
 1941 - November: Battle of Rostov (1941).
 1942 - City taken by German forces.
Up to 30,000 Russian Jews massacred there at a site called Zmievskaya Balka.
 1965
 Voroshilovsky bridge built.
 Population: 720,000.
 1969 - Memorial complex to the Fallen Warriors unveiled.
 1971 - SKA SKVO Stadium built.
 1973 -  created.
 1985
  established.
 Population: 986,000.
 1992 - Rostov Chamber of Commerce established.
 1994 - Rostov State Medical University active.
 1996
  becomes mayor.
 Vladimir Chub becomes governor of Rostov Oblast.
 2000 - City becomes part of the Southern Federal District.

21st century

 2007 - Church of the Intercession built.
 2009 - 24 July: 2009 Rostov-on-Don bus crash occurs near city.
 2010
 Stele City of Military Glory erected.
 Population: 1,089,261.
 2016 - 19 March: Airplane crash occurs.

See also
 Rostov-on-Don history
 
 Timelines of other cities in the Southern Federal District of Russia: Krasnodar, Volgograd

References

This article incorporates information from the Russian Wikipedia.

Bibliography

External links

Rostov-on-Don
Years in Russia
rostov-on-Don
History of Rostov Oblast